Clive Johnston (4 August 1925 – 12 May 1991) was an Australian cricketer. He played eleven first-class matches for New South Wales between 1949/50 and 1957/58.

See also
 List of New South Wales representative cricketers

References

External links
 

1925 births
1991 deaths
Australian cricketers
New South Wales cricketers
Cricketers from Sydney